This is a list of 137 species in the genus Philanthus, beewolves.

Philanthus species

 Philanthus adamsoni Arnold, 1952 i c g
 Philanthus albopictus Taschenberg, 1880 i c g
 Philanthus albopilosus Cresson, 1865 i c g
 Philanthus amabilis Arnold, 1946 i c g
 Philanthus ammochrysus W. Schulz, 1905 i c g
 Philanthus arizonicus R. Bohart, 1972 i c g
 Philanthus arnoldi Berland, 1936 i c g
 Philanthus asmarensis Giordani Soika, 1939 i c g
 Philanthus avidus Bingham, 1896 i c g
 Philanthus banabacoa Alayo Dalmau, 1968 i c g
 Philanthus barbatus F. Smith, 1856 i c g
 Philanthus barbiger Mickel, 1916 i c g
 Philanthus basalis F. Smith, 1856 i c g
 Philanthus basilaris Cresson, 1880 i c g
 Philanthus basilewskyi Leclercq, 1955 i c g
 Philanthus bicinctus (Mickel, 1916) i c g b  (bumble bee wolf)
 Philanthus bilineatus Gravenhorst, 1807 i c g
 Philanthus bilunatus Cresson, 1865 i c g b
 Philanthus bimacula de Saussure, 1891 i c g
 Philanthus boharti G. Ferguson, 1983 i c g
 Philanthus bredoi Arnold, 1946 i c g
 Philanthus brevicornis Guichard, 1994 i c g
 Philanthus bucephalus F. Smith, 1856 i c
 Philanthus camerunensis Tullgren, 1904 i c g
 Philanthus capensis Dahlbom, 1845 i c g
 Philanthus coarctatus Spinola, 1839 i c
 Philanthus coronatus (Thunberg, 1784) i c g
 Philanthus crabroniformis F. Smith, 1856 i c g b
 Philanthus crotoniphilus Viereck and Cockerell, 1904 i c g
 Philanthus curvimaculatus (Cameron, 1910) i c g
 Philanthus decemmaculatus Eversmann, 1849 i c g
 Philanthus dentatus Cameron, 1902 i c g
 Philanthus depredator F. Smith, 1856 i c g
 Philanthus desertorum (F. Morawitz, 1890) i c g
 Philanthus dichrous Kohl, 1894 i c g
 Philanthus dimidiatus Klug, 1845 i c g
 Philanthus dufouri Lucas, 1849 c g
 Philanthus dufourii Lucas, 1849 i
 Philanthus elegantissimus Dalla Torre, 1897 i c g
 Philanthus femoralis Arnold, 1946 i c g
 Philanthus flagellarius R. Turner, 1918 i c g
 Philanthus flavipes Arnold, 1949 i c g
 Philanthus fossulatus R. Turner, 1918 i c g
 Philanthus foveatus Arnold, 1933 i c g
 Philanthus fuscipennis Guérin-Méneville, 1844 i c g
 Philanthus genalis Kohl, 1891 i c g
 Philanthus gibbosus (Fabricius, 1775) i c g b
 Philanthus glaber Kohl, 1891 i c g
 Philanthus gloriosus Cresson, 1865 i c g
 Philanthus gwaaiensis Arnold, 1929 i c g
 Philanthus hellmanni (Eversmann, 1849) i c g
 Philanthus histrio Fabricius, 1804 i c g
 Philanthus impatiens Kohl, 1891 i c g
 Philanthus inversus Patton, 1879 i c g
 Philanthus kaszabi Tsuneki, 1971 i c g
 Philanthus kohlii F. Morawitz, 1890 i c g
 Philanthus kokandicus Radoszkowski, 1877 i c g
 Philanthus komarowi F. Morawitz, 1890 i c g
 Philanthus laticeps Arnold, 1925 i c g
 Philanthus lepidus Cresson, 1865 i c g b
 Philanthus levini R. Bohart, 1972 i c g
 Philanthus limatus Bingham, 1909 i c g
 Philanthus lingyuanensis Yasumatsu, 1935 i c g
 Philanthus loeflingi Dahlbom, 1845 i c g
 Philanthus madagascariensis Brèthes, 1910 i c g
 Philanthus major Kohl, 1891 i c g
 Philanthus melanderi Arnold, 1925 i c g
 Philanthus michelbacheri R. Bohart, 1972 i c g
 Philanthus minor Kohl, 1891 i c g
 Philanthus mongolicus F. Morawitz, 1889 i c g
 Philanthus multimaculatus Cameron, 1891 i c g b
 Philanthus namaqua Arnold, 1925 i c g
 Philanthus nasalis R. Bohart, 1972 i c g b  (Antioch sphecid wasp)
 Philanthus natalensis Arnold, 1925 i c g
 Philanthus neomexicanus Strandtmann, 1946 i c g
 Philanthus nepalensis Bingham, 1908 i c g
 Philanthus nigritus Gravenhorst, 1807 i c g
 Philanthus nigrohirtus R. Turner, 1918 i c g
 Philanthus nitidus Magretti, 1884 i c g
 Philanthus nobilis Kohl, 1891 i c g
 Philanthus notatulus F. Smith, 1862 i c g
 Philanthus nursei (Bingham, 1898) i c g
 Philanthus occidentalis Strandtmann, 1946 i c g
 Philanthus oraniensis Arnold, 1925 i c g
 Philanthus ordinarius Bingham, 1896 i c g
 Philanthus pacificus Cresson, 1880 i c g b
 Philanthus pallidus Klug, 1845 i c g
 Philanthus parkeri G. Ferguson, 1983 i c g
 Philanthus pilifrons Cameron, 1908 i c g
 Philanthus politus Say, 1824 i c g b
 Philanthus promontorii Arnold, 1925 i c g
 Philanthus psyche Dunning, 1896 i c g
 Philanthus pulchellus Spinola, 1843 i c g
 Philanthus pulcher Dalla Torre, 1897 i c g
 Philanthus pulcherrimus F. Smith, 1856 i c g
 Philanthus punjabensis Nurse, 1902 i c g
 Philanthus radamae Arnold, 1945 i c g
 Philanthus ramakrishnae R. Turner, 1918 i c g
 Philanthus reinigi Bischoff, 1930 i c g
 Philanthus rubidus Arnold, 1946 i c g
 Philanthus rubriventris Kazenas, 1970 i c g
 Philanthus rugosifrons Arnold, 1949 i c g
 Philanthus rugosus Kohl, 1891 i c g
 Philanthus rutilus Spinola, 1839 i c g
 Philanthus sanbornii Cresson, 1865 i c g b
 Philanthus schulthessi Maidl, 1924 i c g
 Philanthus schusteri R. Bohart, 1972 i c g
 Philanthus scrutator Nurse, 1902 i c g
 Philanthus sculpturatus Gayubo, 1991 i c g
 Philanthus serrulatae Dunning, 1898 i c g
 Philanthus sicarius F. Smith, 1856 i c g
 Philanthus soikai de Beaumont, 1961 i c g
 Philanthus solivagus Say, 1837 i c g b
 Philanthus sparsipunctatus Arnold, 1946 i c g
 Philanthus spiniger Thunberg, 1815 i c g
 Philanthus stecki W. Schulz, 1906 i c g
 Philanthus strigulosus R. Turner, 1918 i c g
 Philanthus stygius Gerstäcker, 1858 i c g
 Philanthus subconcolor (Bingham, 1898) i c g
 Philanthus sulphureus F. Smith, 1856 i c g
 Philanthus sumptuosus R. Turner, 1917 i c g
 Philanthus taantes Gribodo, 1895 i c g
 Philanthus tarsatus H. Smith, 1908 i c g
 Philanthus tenellus Arnold, 1925 i c g
 Philanthus triangulum (Fabricius, 1775) i c g
 Philanthus tricinctus Gimmerthal, 1836 i c g
 Philanthus tricolor Fairmaire, 1858 i c g
 Philanthus turneri Arnold, 1925 i c g
 Philanthus variegatus Spinola, 1839 i c g
 Philanthus variolosus Arnold, 1932 i c g
 Philanthus ventilabris Fabricius, 1798 i c g b  (bee-killer wasp)
 Philanthus ventralis (Mickel, 1918) i c g
 Philanthus venustus (Rossi, 1790) i c g
 Philanthus walteri Kohl, 1891 i c g
 Philanthus werneri Maidl, 1933 i c g
 Philanthus yerburyi Bingham, 1898 i c g
 Philanthus zebratus Cresson, 1880 i c g

Data sources: i = ITIS, c = Catalogue of Life, g = GBIF, b = Bugguide.net

References

Philanthus